Metrioptera domogledi is a species of insect in family Tettigoniidae. It is found in Hungary and Romania.

References

Tettigoniinae
Insects described in 1882
Taxonomy articles created by Polbot